is a 2018 Japanese romantic comedy film based on Modomu Akagawara's 2015 manga series Anitomo. Directed by Ryo Nakajima, it stars Ryusei Yokohama and Risaki Matsukaze.

Anitomo was first published as a one-shot in Hakusensha's The Hana to Yume magazine in January 2015 before it was launched as a series in May 2015. It was also adapted for a drama series which also stars the same leads. It premiered in March 2018.

Plot

Cast 
 Ryusei Yokohama as Sōta Nishino
 Risaki Matsukaze as Mai Nanase
 Koudai Matsuoka as Ituski Kaga
 Tsuyoshi Furukawa as Yukihiro Nanase
 Karin Ono as Aki Nishino
 Jun Fukuyama as Haginosuke Tachibana

References

External links 
 

2018 films
2010s Japanese-language films
Live-action films based on manga
Manga adapted into films
2010s Japanese films